Pesiöjärvi is a medium-sized lake in the Oulujoki main catchment area. It is located in Suomussalmi municipality, in the region Kainuu, Finland.

See also
List of lakes in Finland

References

Lakes of Suomussalmi